Rick Crom (born March 15, 1957) is an American actor, singer, comedian, lyricist, and composer. He has appeared in numerous television shows and specials, Broadway and off-Broadway musicals, as well as written several off-Broadway revues, and has 3 times been nominated for the Drama Desk Award for Outstanding Lyrics.

Performer
In 1993, Crom made his Broadway acting debut in The Goodbye Girl. He was an understudy in Footloose and appeared in Urinetown: The Musical as Tiny Tom/Dr. Billeaux. His off-Broadway acting credits include the 1994 revival of Merrily We Roll Along and the Encores! productions of Fiorello! and Li'l Abner.

As a comedian, Crom has appeared with the Chicago City Limits, and performed stand-up across the country, most frequently at New York City's Comedy Cellar. On television, he has been seen on Chappelle's Show, Caroline's Comedy Hour, and Tough Crowd with Colin Quinn.  He also appeared on the FX sitcom Louie, starring fellow comic Louis CK.

Crom teaches a course in stand-up comedy at the Comedy Cellar in New York.

Writer
In 2004, Crom wrote the book, music, and lyrics for NEWSical, and received his first Drama Desk nomination for Outstanding Lyrics, with NEWSical picking up a nomination for Outstanding Review . An original cast recording was released on April 5, 2005. Though NEWSical closed in 2005 after 215 performances, a new edition (renamed NEWSICAL the Musical: We Distort, You Decide, and featuring an original book and music) began previews at the 47th Street Theater on November 24, 2009, and opened December 9 of that year. Once again, Crom was nominated for the Drama Desk Award for Outstanding Lyrics, and the show was nominated for the Outstanding Musical Revue award. The 2009–2010 production closed March 21, 2010. The latest edition of NEWSical the Musical: Full Spin Ahead began previews December 13 of that year and opened on January 9, 2011 at The Kirk at Theatre Row.

Crom created the Star Trek spoof Space Trek with bookwriter Marc Lipitz, and authored the topical musical revues Oh Fine RSVP!, The Subject Was Neurosis, Absolutely Rude, and Our Life and Times, which won him a MAC Award and a Backstage Bistro Award for Outstanding Musical Revue.

Crom contributed a majority of the topical material featured at the Crystal Palace Theater in Aspen, Colorado from the late 1980s to 2008 (when the venue closed). A recording of his songs for the Crystal Palace, Who Writes This Stuff? The Songs of Rick Crom, was released in 2008. He currently performs the same function for Laffing Matterz, a dinner theater in Fort Lauderdale, Florida.

In 2009, Crom composed the score and co-wrote lyrics with Fred M. Caruso for the film The Big Gay Musical. He composed the score and wrote the lyrics for Bonnie & Clyde: A Folktale, with a book by his Urinetown co-star Hunter Foster. It was presented at the 2009 New York Musical Theatre Festival, where it won awards for Best Music and Most Promising Musical. Bonnie & Clyde: A Folktale was workshopped in residency at the Academy for New Musical Theatre, through the ASCAP Foundation Irving Caesar Fund Fellowship, a Producer-Writer Initiative granted through NAMT, the National Alliance for Musical Theatre.

References

External links

Stage credits at Broadwayworld.com
Official site

American male musical theatre actors
American musical theatre composers
American male stage actors
American male film actors
American male television actors
1957 births
Gay comedians
Gay singers
Gay songwriters
American LGBT singers
American LGBT songwriters
American gay actors
American gay musicians
Living people
20th-century American LGBT people
21st-century American LGBT people
American LGBT comedians
American gay writers